The Flower with the Petals of Steel (also known as The Flower with the Deadly Sting) is a 1973 Italian giallo film directed by Gianfranco Piccioli, starring Gianni Garko.

Plot
A wealthy physician accidentally kills his mistress and ends up being blackmailed with photos of the crime.

Cast
Gianni Garko: Andrea
Carroll Baker: Evelyn
Paola Senatore: Daniela
Ivano Staccioli: Inspector
Umberto Raho: Director 
Pilar Velázquez: Lena

References

External links

1973 films
1970s crime thriller films
Giallo films
Films scored by Marcello Giombini
1970s Italian films